Sisurcana clavus is a species of moth of the family Tortricidae. It is found in Peru.

The wingspan is about 23 mm. The ground colour of the forewings is cream, densely sprinkled and strigulated (finely streaked) with brownish. The markings are brown. The hindwings are cream, suffused grey posteriorly and with brown-grey strigulation.

Etymology
The species name refers to the termination of the sacculus and is derived from Latin clavus (meaning a claw).

References

Moths described in 2010
Sisurcana
Moths of South America
Taxa named by Józef Razowski